The 2019 Ugandan landslide occurred in the district of Bududa in eastern Uganda on 5 June 2019. Several landslides were triggered by heavy rain, killing 5 whilst 50 are believed missing, and leaving an estimated of 150 houses destroyed.

The mudslides happened on the foothills of Mount Elgon, an extinct volcano

High-risk area
Several mudslides has previously struck the region with the 2010 Ugandan landslide killing 100 people.

References 

2019
2019 in Uganda